Seema Mohile (born 25 May 1965) is a politician from Gujarat, India. She is a member of Bharatiya Janata Party. She was a member of 14th Gujarat Legislative Assembly from Akota constituency.

She was the deputy mayor of Vadodara. She was elected from Akota constituency in 2017 Gujarat legislative assembly election defeating Indian National Congress candidate Ranjit Sharadchandra Chavhan by margin of 57139 votes.

References

Living people
People from Vadodara
Bharatiya Janata Party politicians from Gujarat
Women in Gujarat politics
Gujarat MLAs 2017–2022
21st-century Indian women politicians
21st-century Indian politicians
1965 births